Taliban Cabinet may refer to:

Governments
Cabinet of Afghanistan#Islamic Emirate (1996–2001)
Cabinet of Afghanistan#Islamic Emirate (2021–present)